Medjedel district is an Algerian administrative district in the M'Sila province.  Its capital is town of Medjedel .

Communes 
The district is composed of two communes: 
Medjedel
Ouled Atia

References 

Districts of Tizi Ouzou Province
Districts of Djelfa Province